Allari Alludu is a 1993 Telugu-language comedy drama film directed by A. Kodandarami Reddy. It stars Nagarjuna, Meena, Nagma, Vanisri and music composed by M. M. Keeravani. The film was recorded as a Blockbuster at the box office. The film was dubbed and released in Tamil as Galatta Maappillai and in Malayalam as Hey Madam. The film was remade in Kannada as Gadibidi Aliya (1995).

Plot
Akhilandeswari (Vanisri) is an arrogant rich lady who loves money dearly. She has two daughters: Sravani (Nagma) and Sandhya (Meena). While Sravani is as arrogant as her mother, Sandhya is a lover of poor people and values humanity like her father (Rao Gopala Rao).

Sravani arrives in town to study for a degree, where Kalyan (Nagarjuna) is a canteen owner. Sravani finds Kalyan's bold nature and cool attitude highly demeaning and her anger goes to heights when Kalyan teases her in front of all the college students. Sravani cleverly traps Kalyan saying she is in love with him and gets him imprisoned during a rift in college.

Kalyan decides to teach Sravani a lesson and he arrives in Akhilandeswari's house as the latter's associate and helps her in income tax issues. At one moment when income tax issues are unbearable, Kalyan suggests to Akhilandeswari that somebody in the family should take the responsibility of the property. When nobody is willing to do so, she offers Kalyan the same and also asks him to marry Sandhya. Sravani gets distraught knowing this and the rest of the film is about what happens to the equations between the lead characters.

Cast

Nagarjuna as Kalyan & Rajesh (Dual role)
Meena as Sandhya
Nagma as Sravani
Rao Gopala Rao
Vanisri as Akhilandeswari
Murali Mohan
Sangeetha
Kota Srinivasa Rao
Chalapathi Rao
Rakhee
Brahmanandam
Babu Mohan
Rallapalli
Suthi Velu						
Gundu Hanumantha Rao		
K. K. Sharma as Principal
Chitti Babu  
Chidatala Appa Rao  
Garimalla Viswaswara Rao
 Ramya Krishna as item number "Ninu Road Meeda"

Soundtrack

The music was composed by M. M. Keeravani. Music released on SURYA Audio.

References

External links

1993 films
Indian comedy-drama films
Films directed by A. Kodandarami Reddy
Films scored by M. M. Keeravani
Telugu films remade in other languages
1990s Telugu-language films
1993 comedy-drama films